Anđelija Arbutina Šarenac (born March 29, 1967) is a former Serbian basketball player who competed for Yugoslavia in the 1988 Summer Olympics.

Career achievements
 Yugoslav League champion: 2 (with Crvena zvezda: 1988–89, 1991–92)
 Israeli League champion: 2 (with A.S. Ramat HaSharon: 1998–99, 2000–01)
 Yugoslav Cup champion: 1 (with Crvena zvezda: 1991–92)
 Yugoslav (Serbia and Montenegro) Cup winner: 2 (with Crvena zvezda: 1993–94; with Hemofarm: 1994–95)
 Israeli State Cup winner: 1 (with A.S. Ramat HaSharon: 1998–99)

External links

1967 births
Living people
Basketball players from Belgrade
Basketball players at the 1988 Summer Olympics
Fenerbahçe women's basketball players
ŽKK Crvena zvezda players
ŽKK Vršac players
Medalists at the 1988 Summer Olympics
Medalists at the 1987 Summer Universiade
Olympic basketball players of Yugoslavia
Olympic silver medalists for Yugoslavia
Olympic medalists in basketball
Serbian expatriate basketball people in Hungary
Serbian expatriate basketball people in Italy
Serbian expatriate basketball people in Israel
Serbian expatriate basketball people in Turkey
Serbian expatriate basketball people in Bosnia and Herzegovina
Serbian women's basketball players
Shooting guards
Yugoslav women's basketball players
Universiade medalists in basketball
Universiade gold medalists for Yugoslavia